The 2019 Tampa Bay Rowdies season was the club's tenth season of existence, their third in the United Soccer League, and first in the newly named USL Championship. Including the previous Tampa Bay Rowdies, this was the 26th season of a franchise in the Tampa Bay metro area with the Rowdies moniker. Including the now-defunct Tampa Bay Mutiny, this was the 32nd season of professional soccer in the Tampa Bay region.

Club

Current roster

Technical staff
  Neill Collins – head coach 
  Cheyne Roberts – assistant coach
  Martin Paterson – assistant coach
  Stuart Dobson – goalkeeper coach
  Pete Calabrese – performance coach
  Bentley Smith – kit man

Medical staff
  Andrew Keane – head athletic trainer
  Michelle Leget – assistant athletic trainer
  Dr. Mohit Bansal – team physician and orthopedic surgeon
  Dr. Vania Reyes – team physician, sports medicine

Front office
  Stuart Sternberg – owner 
  Lee Cohen – vice president and chief operating officer
  Matthew Silverman – vice chairmen 
  Brian Auld – vice chairmen

Competitions

Exhibitions 
The Rowdies hosted Major League Soccer teams in the Suncoast Invitational for the fourth year in a row.

USL Championship

Standings

Results summary

Results by round

Results

USL Championship playoffs 

The Rowdies clinched their spot in the single elimination 2019 USL playoffs on September 18, by virtue of the Charleston Battery losing, 3-1, to Atlanta United 2.

Conference Quarterfinals

U.S. Open Cup

Honors

Individual honors
USL All-League
 Papé Diakité (2nd team), Sebastián Guenzatti (2nd team)

References 

Tampa Bay Rowdies
Tampa Bay Rowdies (2010–) seasons
Tampa Bay Rowdies
Tampa Bay Rowdies
Sports in St. Petersburg, Florida